Patrind Hydropower Plant is a run-of-the-river, high head project of , located on Kunhar River near Patrind Village right on the border of Abbottabad District of Khyber Pakhtunkhwa Province and Muzaffarabad city of Azad Kashmir, Pakistan.

The dam and the tunnel has been constructed on Kunhar River at Patrind Village in Muzaffarabad District, AJK and Abbottabad District on the right bank in Boi Village and the power house on the right bank of Jehlum River in Muzaffarabad, AJK at lower Chattar near Thuri Park.

Design and construction
The Korean construction company Star Hydro Power Limited (SHPL), an Independent Power Producer (IPP), has set up the  Patrind Hydropower Plant, which is the second private hydro power project in Pakistan. Project is being financed by IFC, ADB and K-Exim Bank. The company has completed the project in a period of three-and-a-half years at an estimated cost of $400 million. The project would generate 150 megawatts of electricity which would not only help improve the electricity voltage in Abbottabad and Mansehra districts but also boost economic activities in the region.

Since the project is being developed by SHPL as an IPP, the SHPL has entered into a 30-year Power Purchase Agreement with National Transmission and Dispatch Company (NTDC), Pakistan's grid system operator, for the sale of electricity generated from the Project.

The first independent hydro power project in the private sector – New Bong Escape Hydropower Project of 84MW – has already been completed and started commercial operation in March 2013.

The total electricity generation capacity of the Patrind Hydropower Plant is 150 MW. A surface type powerhouse to accommodate three Vertical Francis Turbine Units, each of 50 MW capacity, is proposed on the right bank of Jehlum River. The crest elevation is 757 m which is approximately 26m high from the river bed. There will be four radial type crest gates each  in size.

See also 

 List of dams and reservoirs in Pakistan
 List of power stations in Pakistan
 Khan Khwar Hydropower Project
 Satpara Dam
 Gomal Zam Dam
 Duber Khwar hydropower project
 Kohala Hydropower Project

References 

Energy infrastructure completed in 2012
Hydroelectric power stations in Pakistan
Run-of-the-river power stations
Dams in Khyber Pakhtunkhwa